Audio or video of arguments
Law-related lists